The Women's madison at the UEC European Track Championships will be completed for first time in 2016 in Saint-Quentin-en-Yvelines, France.

Medalists

References

 
Women's madison
Women's madison